The Jiangsu Kawei Automotive Industrial Group is an automotive manufacturing company of People's Republic of China based in Danyang in Jiangsu Province.

Company history 
The Jiangsu Kawei Automotive Industrial Group was founded in 1992 and started out making mini buses, special vehicles, and vehicle parts. 

In 2012, Jiangsu Kawei Automotive Industry Group started to build cars and the Kawei Auto (卡威汽车) brand was launched.

Vehicles 
Vehicle products of Jiangsu Kawei Automotive Industrial Group are listed as below:

Pickups and SUVs 
Kawei K1 
Kawei K150
Kawei K150GT
Kawei W1 (Kawei Louis)

Electric vehicles
Kawei EV1
Kawei EV4
Kawei EV5
Kawei EV7
Kawei Elfin
Hummer HX electric

References

External links 
 Kawei Auto

Car manufacturers of China
Vehicle manufacturing companies established in 1992
Chinese companies established in 1992
Chinese brands
Car brands
Electric vehicle manufacturers of China